Lebia atriceps is a species of ground beetle in the family Carabidae. It is found in North America (Canada, Mexico and the United States)

References

Further reading

 
 

Lebia
Beetles described in 1863
Taxa named by John Lawrence LeConte